Nicholas John Coffield (born 23 October 1999) is a professional Australian rules footballer playing for the St Kilda Football Club in the Australian Football League (AFL). He was drafted by St Kilda with their second selection and eighth overall in the 2017 national draft.

Early life 
Coffield captained his school football side and the Northern Knights when he was 18. He also had a standout national carnival representing Vic Metro in the TAC Cup, earning All-Australian selection in his final year of junior footy.

AFL career
In April 2018, Coffield and fellow 2017 draftee Hunter Clark extended their contracts with St Kilda until the end of 2021. He ultimately managed 10 games in his debut season, averaging slightly less than 15 disposals at an average of 85% efficiency, the fourth highest average for St Kilda in 2018.

Coffield played nearly all of the first half of the 2019 season in St Kilda's VFL affiliate Sandringham, before playing his first senior AFL game in Round 11 against Port Adelaide in Shanghai. Overall, he played 8 games in the 2019 Season. His season ended early after suffering a dislocated shoulder in St Kilda's Round 21 match against Fremantle.

Coffield is currently studying a Bachelor of Arts/Commerce at Deakin University.

2020 was a breakout year for Coffield, with the defender playing every game for the season with the exception of Round 1, plus two finals, playing 18 of a possible 19 games in a Covid-interrupted season. Despite the shortened season and quarters, Coffield established himself a prominent defender who averaged over 15 disposals and six marks a game. Coffield finished the regular season with a team high 100 marks from 16 games, as well as finished first at the Saints for intercept marks and total intercepts. He was also equal second for rebound-50s and effective disposals. Coffield's form was rewarded an interchange position in the AFL's 22Under22 side.

Coffield's 2021 season reflected his team's, a inconsistent year that didn't reach the heights of the previous. Coffield also found himself in and out of the side, playing 16 of a possible 22 games including missing three due to a hamstring injury. He did however have a strong performance against Richmond in Round five, collecting 23 disposals and 12 marks and a good game against Fremantle in Round 23 where he had 21 disposals and seven marks.

Statistics
 Statistics are correct to the end of round 7, 2022

|- style="background-color: #EAEAEA"
! scope="row" style="text-align:center" | 2018
|
| 33 || 10 || 1 || 0 || 86 || 62 || 148 || 46 || 14 || 0.1 || 0.0 || 8.6 || 6.2 || 14.8 || 4.6 || 1.4
|-
! scope="row" style="text-align:center" | 2019
|
| 1 || 8 || 0 || 0 || 80 || 39 || 119 || 46 || 9 || 0.0 || 0.0 || 10.0 || 4.9 || 14.9 || 5.8 || 1.1
|- style="background-color: #EAEAEA"
! scope="row" style="text-align:center" | 2020
|
| 1 || 18 || 0 || 0 || 181 || 93 || 274 || 117 || 18 || 0.0 || 0.0 || 10.1 || 5.2 || 15.2 || 6.5 || 1.0
|-
! scope="row" style="text-align:center" | 2021
|
| 1 || 16 || 1 || 1 || 159 || 69 || 228|| 89 || 25 || 0.1 || 0.1 || 9.9 || 4.3 || 14.3 || 5.6 || 1.6
|- style="background-color: #EAEAEA"
! scope="row" style="text-align:center" | 2022
|
| 1 || 0 || – || – || – || – || – || – || – || – || – || – || – || – || – || –
|- class="sortbottom"
! colspan=3| Career
! 52
! 2
! 1
! 506
! 263
! 769
! 298
! 66
! 0.0
! 0.0
! 9.7
! 5.1
! 14.8
! 5.7
! 1.3
|}

Notes

References

External links

1999 births
Living people
St Kilda Football Club players
Northern Knights players
Sandringham Football Club players
Australian rules footballers from Victoria (Australia)